Lawrence County Airport may refer to:

 Lawrenceburg-Lawrence County Airport in Lawrence County, Tennessee, United States (FAA: 2M2)
 Lawrence County Airpark in Lawrence County, Ohio, United States (FAA: HTW)
 Courtland Airport, formerly Lawrence County Airport, in Lawrence County, Alabama, United States (FAA: 9A4)

See also 
 Lawrence County (disambiguation)
 Lawrence Airport (disambiguation)
 Lawrence Municipal Airport (disambiguation)